The 2013 Toyota Grand Prix of Long Beach was the 39th annual running of the Toyota Grand Prix of Long Beach, and is also the  third race of the 2013 IndyCar Series season, taking place on April 21, 2013 in Long Beach, California on its temporary street circuit. The race was won by Takuma Sato of A. J. Foyt Enterprises.

Report

Background
The first two rounds of the season were dominated by Andretti Autosport drivers James Hinchcliffe and defending series champion Ryan Hunter-Reay, with Hinchcliffe winning the Honda Grand Prix of St. Petersburg and Hunter-Reay winning the Indy Grand Prix of Alabama. The defending race winner was Will Power.

Qualifying
In the second group of the first session, Marco Andretti was penalized for interference, and did not advance, starting in 26th.

Starting grid

Race
Pole-sitter Dario Franchitti dominated the first 28 laps before falling behind Will Power. Power led until lap 30, in which he pitted, giving the lead to Takuma Sato, who did not relinquish the lead for the rest of the race to win his first career race in 52 starts, becoming the first Japanese driver to win an IndyCar Series race. The win was A. J. Foyt Enterprises' first victory since Airton Daré won the Ameristar Casino Indy 200 at Kansas in 2002. Graham Rahal finished second, Justin Wilson and Franchitti finished third and fourth, respectively. J. R. Hildebrand, Oriol Servia, Marco Andretti, Simon Pagenaud, Simona de Silvestro and Hélio Castroneves rounded out the top ten.

Results

Notes
 Points include 1 point for leading at least 1 lap during a race, an additional 2 points for leading the most race laps, and 1 point for Pole Position.

Standings after the race

 Note: Only the top ten positions are included.

References

Grand Prix of Long Beach
Toyota Grand Prix of Long Beach
Toyota Grand Prix of Long Beach
Toyota Grand Prix of Long Beach